Klaus Weinand (born 14 December 1940) is a former German basketball player. He competed in the men's tournament at the 1972 Summer Olympics.

References

External links
 

1940 births
Living people
German men's basketball players
Olympic basketball players of West Germany
Basketball players at the 1972 Summer Olympics
Sportspeople from Koblenz
USC Heidelberg players